The following is a list of films produced in the Kannada film industry in India in 1981, presented in alphabetical order.

See also

Kannada films of 1980
Kannada films of 1982

1981
Lists of 1981 films by country or language
Films, Kannada